Mexico–Thailand relations are the diplomatic relations between Mexico and Thailand. Both nations are members of the Asia-Pacific Economic Cooperation, Forum of East Asia-Latin America Cooperation and the United Nations.

History 
The first unofficial relations between Mexico and Thailand took place in the late 16th century when Spain had colonized Mexico (known then as New Spain) and traded Mexican silver, chili peppers and fruits to the Kingdom of Siam (present day Thailand) from its colony in the Philippines. Trade between both nations continued until Mexico obtained its independence from Spain in 1821. It would be another 150 years before both nations were to establish diplomatic relations. On 28 August 1975, Mexico and Thailand formally established diplomatic relations. In 1978, Thailand opened a resident embassy in Mexico City and in September 1989, Mexico reciprocated the gesture by opening a resident embassy in Bangkok.

In March 2002, Prime Minister Thaksin Shinawatra became the first Thai head-of-government to visit Mexico. In 2003, Mexican President Vicente Fox paid a visit to Thailand. On 23 May 2014, Mexico condemned the Thai coup d'état and asked for a peaceful resolution to the conflict. Each year, since the establishment of diplomatic relations, the governments of both nations offer scholarships to citizens of each nation to study in Mexico/Thailand for graduate and/or diplomatic training. In 2015, both nations celebrated their 40th anniversary of establishing diplomatic relations.

High-level visits

High-level visits from Mexico to Thailand

 President Vicente Fox (2003)
 Foreign Minister Patricia Espinosa Cantellano (2011)

High-level visits from Thailand to Mexico

 Prince Vajiralongkorn (1996)
 Prime Minister Thaksin Shinawatra (March and October 2002)

Bilateral agreements
Both nations have signed several bilateral agreements such as an Agreement of Aviation and Transportation Cooperation (1992); Agreement on Visa Exemption for Diplomatic and Official Passports (1999); Agreement on Cultural and Educational Cooperation (2003) and a  Memorandum of Understanding for the Establishment of a Mechanism of Consultation in Matters of Mutual Interest (2011).

Trade relations 
In 2018, two-way trade between both nations amounted to US$6 billion.  The main export products from Thailand to Mexico are: electrical machinery, general machinery, rubber, medical equipment, plastic products, iron and steel products, textiles and clothing, toys and sports equipment, glass and glassware, footwear, automobiles and parts automotive and food processing. The main export products from Mexico to Thailand are: machinery, autos and auto parts, iron and steel, chemicals, electrical machinery, aluminum, copper, cardboard and paper, fish and seafood and pharmaceuticals. Mexico is Thailand's biggest trading partner in Latin America and Thailand is Mexico's 6th biggest trading partner in the Asia-Pacific region.

Resident diplomatic missions 
 Mexico has an embassy in Bangkok.
 Thailand has an embassy in Mexico City.

References

Thailand
Bilateral relations of Thailand